Pedroso is a former civil parish in the municipality of Vila Nova de Gaia, Portugal. In 2013, the parish merged into the new parish Pedroso e Seixezelo. The population in 2011 was 18,714, in an area of 19.43 km².

Heritage
Castro da Senhora da Saúde ou Monte Murado

References

Former parishes of Vila Nova de Gaia